Elise Mertens and An-Sophie Mestach were the defending champions, but Mestach chose not to participate this year and Mertens chose to compete in Brisbane instead.

Kiki Bertens and Johanna Larsson won the title, defeating Demi Schuurs and Renata Voráčová in the final, 6–2, 6–2.

Seeds

Draw

References 

 Main draw

WTA Auckland Open
ASB Classic - Women's Doubles